Christer Ödling (born 29 July 1962) is a Swedish curler.

Teams

References

External links
 
 Spektrakon Örnsköldsvik, Esbjörnsson Amatörföreningen och Team NP Göteborg tar klivet upp till Elitserien - Svenska Curlingförbundet 

1962 births
Swedish male curlers
Living people